Becquartina is a genus of Asian cicadas in the tribe Gaeanini and the monotypic subtribe Becquartinina.  This genus includes species that were previously placed in Gaeana and are sometimes known as "butterfly cicadas" due to their colourful wings.

Species
The Catalogue of Life lists:
 Becquartina bifasciata (Chen KF, 1943)
 Becquartina bleuzeni Boulard, 2005
 Becquartina decorata (Kato, 1940) - type species (as Gaeana decorata Kato)
 Becquartina electa (Jacobi, 1902)
 Becquartina ruiliensis Chou & Yao, 1985
 Becquartina versicolor Boulard, 2005

References

External links 

Images on Cicada mania

Cicadas
Gaeanini
Hemiptera of Asia
Cicadidae genera